The women's bantamweight (48 kg/105.6 lbs) Low-Kick division at the W.A.K.O. European Championships 2004 in Budva was the lightest of the female Low-Kick tournaments and involved just three fighters.  Each of the matches was three rounds of two minutes each and were fought under Low-Kick kickboxing rules.

As there were too few fighters for a tournament designed for four, one of the women had a bye straight through to the final.  The tournament winner was Raisa Akulova from Russia who defeated Dragana Zanini from host nation Serbia and Montenegro by unanimous decision in the gold medal match.  The events only other fighter, Nikolett Simon from Hungary received the bronze medal.

Results

Key

See also
List of WAKO Amateur European Championships
List of WAKO Amateur World Championships
List of female kickboxers

References

External links
 WAKO World Association of Kickboxing Organizations Official Site

W.A.K.O. European Championships 2004 (Budva)